Pengiran Muhammad Yusuf bin Abdul Rahim (May 2, 1923 – April 11, 2016), pen name Yura Halim, was a Bruneian politician, civil servant, diplomat, and writer. He served as the Chief Minister (Menteri Besar) of Brunei from 1967 to 1972. Halim wrote the lyrics for Brunei's national anthem, "Allah Peliharakan Sultan," in 1947. The song was adopted as the country's official national anthem in 1951, when it was still a British protectorate. Halim was longtime member of the Legislative Council of Brunei, serving on the council until his death in 2016.

Early life
Halim was born in Tutong, Brunei, on May 2, 1923. He began his education at Bukit Bendera Malay School in Tutong, which he attend from age 10 until he reached fifth grade. In 1939, he became a trainee teacher, or student teacher, at Bukit Bendera Malay School, which is now known as Muda Hashim Secondary School, in Tutong. He then enrolled in courses to become a teacher at Sultan Idris Teachers College in Perak, British Malaya, beginning in 1939. Following the Japanese invasion of Malaya in 1941, Halim was transferred to Kita Bornei Kanri Yosei Jo in Kuching, Sarawak, to study the Japanese language.

In 1944, Halim enrolled in advanced Japanese studies at the International School Kokusai Gakuyukai in Tokyo. Halim then studied at the Hiroshima University of Arts and Sciences, now known as present-day Hiroshima University, in April 1945, towards the end of World War II. On August 6, 1945, Halim, who was a student in at the university, survived the atomic bombing of Hiroshima. Yura Halim was one of only three Southeast Asian students who survived the bombings of Hiroshima and Nagasaki. The other two survivors were Abdul Razak, who later became a professor of Japanese in Malaysia, and Hasan Rahaya, an Indonesian politician.

Career
Yura Halim returned to Brunei following the end of World War II, where he worked as a teacher at Kuala Belait Malay School. He also studied public administration at South Devon Technical College in Devon, England, United Kingdom, in 1954.

He was then appointed as an officer in the Information Office in 1957. In 1962, he was further appointed as the Deputy State Secretary and Director of Broadcasting and Information, a position he held from 1962 to 1964.

Halim was elevated to the post of State Secretary of Brunei in 1964. He was appointed acting Chief Minister of Brunei in 1965 and was confirmed to the office as permanent Chief Minister in 1967. He held the office of Chief Minister, also known as Menteri Besar, from 1967 to 1972. In 1968, he was bestowed the title Pengiran Setia Negara, admitting him into the senior ranks of the Cheteria ministers. He retired from the Bruneian civil service in 1973.

In 1995, Yura Halim was appointed High Commissioner of Brunei to Malaysia by Sultan Hassanal Bolkiah. He was next appointed Ambassador to Japan in 2001.

Halim, a resident of Sengkarai in Tutong District, died on April 11, 2016, at the age of 92. He was survived by eight children, 38 grandchildren, and 22 great-grandchildren.

Bibliography

Honours
Yura Halim was awarded an honorary doctorate from Hiroshima University for promoting peace and bilateral relations between Brunei and Japan on April 22, 2013. He was the first Bruneian to receive such an honor. The only two other Southeast Asian survivors of Hiroshima and Nagasaki, Hasan Rahaya of Indonesia and Abdul Razak of Malaysia, had previously been awarded honorary doctorates from Hiroshima University as well. He has also received the following awards;

Namesake 

 Pengiran Setia Negara Pengiran Mohd Yusof Primary School, school in Seria.

National 

  Family Order of Laila Utama (DK) – Dato Laila Utama (1968)
  Order of Seri Paduka Mahkota Brunei First Class (SPMB) – Dato Seri Paduka (1963)
  Order of Setia Negara Brunei Second Class (DSNB) – Dato Setia
  Omar Ali Saifuddin Medal (POAS) – (1962)
  Sultan Hassanal Bolkiah Medal (PHBS) – (1970)
  Meritorious Service Medal (PJK) – (1959)
  Long Service Medal (PKL) – (1959)
  Armed Forces Service Medal (PBLI) – (2008)
  Campaign Medal – (1963)

Foreign 
 :
  Order of the British Empire Commander (CBE) – (1968)

:
  Order of the Rising Sun – (1984)

References

1923 births
2016 deaths
Chief Ministers of Brunei
Government ministers of Brunei
Hibakusha
Members of the Legislative Council of Brunei
National anthem writers
High Commissioners of Brunei to Malaysia
Ambassadors of Brunei to Japan
Bruneian civil servants
Bruneian songwriters
Bruneian writers
Brunei–Japan relations
Sultan Idris Education University alumni
ms:Yura Halim